Reuben Tom Patton (15 August 1883 – 24 June 1962) was an Australian rules footballer who played with University in the Victorian Football League.

He later served in World War I before embarking on a successful career as an academic in the fields of forestry and botany. He died in 1962.

Sources

External links

1883 births
University Football Club players
Australian rules footballers from Victoria (Australia)
1962 deaths